Bermudamysis speluncola is a species of crustacean in the family Mysidae, endemic to Bermuda, and the only species in the genus Bermudamysis.

See also
Platyops

References

Mysida
Endemic fauna of Bermuda
Crustaceans of the Atlantic Ocean
Monotypic crustacean genera
Taxonomy articles created by Polbot